Yesu may refer to:
Yesu or Yeshu, alternate forms of the name Jesus
Wat Preah Yesu, orphanage of Cambodia
Yesu Hei (died 1171), father of Genghis Khan
Yesü Möngke (died 1252), son of Chagatai Khan
Yesü Nto'a, brother of Yesü Möngke